The 1948 German football championship, the 38th edition of the competition, was the culmination of the 1947–48 football season in Allied-occupied Germany. 1. FC Nürnberg were crowned champions for the seventh time after one-leg knock-out tournament. It was the first time the championship had been played since 1944. It was Nürnberg's tenth appearance in the final. For the losing finalists 1. FC Kaiserslautern, it was the first appearance in the final since the establishment of a national championship in 1903.

Eight teams were to take part in the final stage which was played in a one-leg knock-out tournament, the vice-champions and champions of the British, American and French occupation zones, the champion of the Soviet occupation zone and the Berlin champion. In the end, SG Planitz were not allowed to travel to Stuttgart to play their quarter final against eventual champions Nürnberg.

The 1948 championship is unique as it is the only one of the German championships where no trophy was awarded. The pre-Second World War trophy, the Viktoria had disappeared during the final stages of the war and would not resurface until after the German reunification, while the new trophy, the Meisterschale, would only be ready for the following season.

Qualified teams
The qualified teams through the 1947–48 Oberliga and Ostzonenmeisterschaft seasons:

Competition

Quarter-finals

Semi-finals

Final

References

Sources
 kicker Allmanach 1990, by kicker, page 164 & 177 - German championship

External links
 German Championship 1947-48 at Weltfussball.de
 Germany - Championship 1948 at RSSSF.com
 German championship 1948 at Fussballdaten.de

German football championship seasons
German Football Championship, 1948